Cheung Wah is one of the 18 constituencies in the North District, Hong Kong.

The constituency returns one district councillor to the North District Council, with an election every four years.

Cheung Wah constituency has an estimated population of 16,358.

Councillors represented

Election results

2010s

References

Fanling
Constituencies of Hong Kong
Constituencies of North District Council
1991 establishments in Hong Kong
Constituencies established in 1991